Yi Won-rok (May 18, 1904 – January 16, 1944), better known by his pen name Yi Yuksa, was a Korean poet and independence activist. As one of his country's most famous poets, he and his works symbolize the spirit of the anti-Japanese resistance of the 1930s and 1940s.

Life
Yi was born in Dosan-myeon, Andong on May 18, 1904. Yi was a descendant of the scholar Yi Hwang, better known as Toegye. Yi completed his basic education in Andong, graduating at the age of 15 in 1919. 

In 1920, at age 17, he moved with his family to Daegu and married. Yi became a teacher at the academy at which he studied, but in 1924 left for Japan to study in University.

In 1925, Yi returned to Daegu and along with his brothers and joined the Uiyoldan, an association formed in response to Japanese repression of the Korean Independence Movement. The Uiyoldan was associated with acts of sabotage and assassination. Yi moved to Beijing in 1925/26, likely because of this association, and studied at Sun Yat-sen University in Guangzhou. Yi returned to Korea in 1927. When members of the Uiyoldan bombed the Daegu branch of the Choseon Bank, Yi was among the arrested and spent 18 months in prison. There he was given the number 264 ('Yi Yuk-sa' in Korean) which he adopted afterwards as his pen name.

In 1929 Yi began to work as a journalist, and in 1930 he published his first poem. "Horse", in the Choseon Ilbo. From 1931 to 1933 he studied in China, but continued to maintain contacts with the Korean resistance. In 1935 he began to concentrate on his writing, publishing both poems and critical essays. Accounts have Yi being arrested a total of 17 times.

Death
In April 1943, he went to Beijing and apparently began smuggling weapons into Korea. That same year, Yi returned to Korea on the first anniversary of the death of his mother. He was arrested in Korea, and transferred to Beijing, where he died in prison on January 16, 1944, at the age of 39. Controversy lingered after Yi's death, and there are allegations from eyewitnesses that suggest Yi was subject to live experimentation - which was common practice in Japanese prisons during the period.  It is reported Yi's bloodstream was injected with saline solution in the prison hospital - which subsequently killed him."He was cremated and buried in Miari, Seoul.

In 1960, Yi’s remains were reinterred near his birthplace and in 1968 a memorial stone was erected in Andong. Just outside Andong there is the Yi Yuksa Museum, dedicated to the memory of his literature and freedom-fighting.

Work
While Yi only wrote approximately forty poems, the fact that they have come to represent the resistance spirit of the Korean people against the Japanese colonial government has made his work famous in Korea. In 1939 Yi published his most famous poem, "Green Grapes". Yi strove to write in the tradition of Korean lyric poetry, among other things writing in Hangul at a time during which this was banned by the Japanese government. Because of Japanese censorship, his writing had to employ symbol and metaphor, never directly commenting on Japanese colonialism or the issues that surrounded it. Nevertheless, his meaning was clear to Koreans, and because of this and his lyricism, his work continues to be included in school textbooks in Korea.

"The Wide Plain" is perhaps the clearest example of Yi's ability to combine lyricism with anti-colonial sentiment:

On a distant day,
When heaven first opened,
Somewhere a cock must have crowed.

No mountain ranges,
Rushing to the desired sea,
Could have dared to invade this land.

While the busy seasons gust and fade,
With endless time,
A great river first opens the way.

Now snow falls,
The fragrance of plum blossoms is far off,
I’ll sow the seed of my sad song here.

When a superman comes
On a white horse down the myriad years,
Let him sing aloud my song on the wide plain.

After Yi's death, in 1946, his brother published some 20 of his poems. A second edition followed in 1956, and in 1974 an authoritative edition.

Poems in English
The Wind and the Waves: Four Modern Korean Poets (ed. Lee Sung-Il), Asian Humanities Press 1989, p.2ff, name transliterated as Yi-Yook-sa
"The Summit" / "Deep-Purple Grapes" / "The Lake" / "The Wide Plain" / "Flower" / "A Tall Tree" in Modern Korean literature: an anthology (ed. Peter H. Lee), University of Hawaii 1990, pp.75-9
"Twilight" / "The Grapes" / "The Vertex" / "Wilderness" / "Flowers", in Modern Korean Poetry (ed. Jaihiun Kim), Jain Publishing Company, 1994, pp.57-9
"Twilight" / "Thatched House" / "A Small Park" / "The Summit"/ "Blue Grapes", in The Columbia Anthology of Modern Korean Poetry (ed. David McCann), Columbia University 2004, pp.37-40

In popular culture
Yi Yuksa featured in the 2011 television drama The Peak (절정).

See also

Korea under Japanese rule
List of Korean-language poets
Yi Yuksa Literary Museum

References

External links
Yi Yuksa Museum

1904 births
1944 deaths
Korean writers
20th-century Korean poets
Korean independence activists
People from Andong